Kim Kwang-Sam (Hangul: 김광삼, Hanja: 金光三) (born August 15, 1980 in Seoul) is a South Korean starting pitcher who plays for the LG Twins in the Korea Baseball Organization. He bats left-handed and throws right-handed.

Amateur career
Kim attended Shinil High School. In , he was selected for the South Korean junior national team and competed in the World Junior Baseball Championship held in Moncton, Canada.

Notable international careers

Professional career

Notable international careers

External links 
 Korea Baseball Organization career statistics from Koreabaseball.com

South Korean baseball players
LG Twins players
1980 births
Living people